Hajjiabad (also Romanized as Ḩājjīābād and Hājiābād; also known as Haji Abad Japlogh) is a village in Kuhsar Rural District, in the Central District of Shazand County, Markazi Province, Iran. At the 2006 census, its population was 412, in 102 families.

References 

Populated places in Shazand County